Ian Docker (born 12 September 1969) is an English former professional footballer. He made over 100 appearances for Gillingham between 1987 and 1991, scoring three goals.

References

1969 births
Living people
English footballers
Gillingham F.C. players
Sing Tao SC players
Guangdong Winnerway F.C. players
Ebbsfleet United F.C. players
Sportspeople from Gravesend, Kent
Expatriate footballers in Hong Kong
Sittingbourne F.C. players
Expatriate footballers in China
Redbridge Forest F.C. players
Association football midfielders
English expatriate sportspeople in Hong Kong
English expatriate footballers